The Commissioner for Agriculture is a member of the European Commission. The post is currently held by Commissioner Janusz Wojciechowski. The post is in charge of rural issues including most notably the controversial Common Agricultural Policy (CAP) which represents 44% of the EU budget. They also participate in meetings of the Agriculture and Fisheries Council (Agrifish) configuration of the Council of the European Union.

List of commissioners

See also
 Agriculture and Fisheries Council (Council of the European Union)
 Common Agricultural Policy 
 Directorate-General for Agriculture and Rural Development
 Directorate-General for Agriculture, Fisheries, Social Affairs and Health
 Doha Development Round
 European Parliament Committee on Agriculture and Rural Development
 Geographical indications and traditional specialities in the European Union
 Land allocation decision support system
 Single Payment Scheme

References

External links
 Commissioner's website 
 Commission Agriculture website

European Union and agriculture
Agriculture and Rural Development